Jennifer Elizabeth Thorne is an American ophthalmologist and epidemiologist. She is the Cross Family Professor of Ophthalmology and a professor of epidemiology at Johns Hopkins University.

Education 
Thorne graduated in 1991 with a bachelor of science, magna cum laude, at College of William & Mary. She completed a doctor of medicine at University of Virginia School of Medicine in 1996. She was an intern in medicine at University of Maryland, Baltimore from 1996 to 1997. From 1997 to 2000, she was a resident at Scheie Eye Institute. She was the chief resident from 1999 to 2000. Thorne completed a doctor of philosophy in epidemiology in 2006 from Johns Hopkins Bloomberg School of Public Health. Her dissertation was titled Visual acuity loss among patients with AIDS and cytomegalovirus retinitis in the era of highly active antiretroviral therapy. Her doctoral advisor was Curtis L. Meinert.

Career 
Beginning in 2013, Thorne holds a joint appointment as the Cross Family Professor of Ophthalmology at the Wilmer Eye Institute and a professor of epidemiology at Bloomberg School of Public Health. At Wilmer, Thorne is the chief of the division of ocular immunology.

Personal life 
Thorne is a member of the LGBT community and participates in the OUTList network of mentors at Johns Hopkins University.

References

External links 
 

Living people
Year of birth missing (living people)
American ophthalmologists
American women epidemiologists
American epidemiologists
Women ophthalmologists
Johns Hopkins Bloomberg School of Public Health alumni
Johns Hopkins Bloomberg School of Public Health faculty
College of William & Mary alumni
University of Virginia School of Medicine alumni
American LGBT scientists
LGBT academics
20th-century American women physicians
20th-century American women scientists
21st-century American women physicians
21st-century American women scientists
20th-century American scientists
20th-century American physicians
21st-century American scientists
21st-century American physicians